Issa Gulamhussein Shivji (born 1946) is a Tanzanian author and academic, and one of Africa's leading experts on law and development issues. He has taught and worked in universities all over the world. He is a prolific writer and researcher, producing books, monographs and articles, as well as a weekly column printed in national newspapers.

Biography
Born in Kilosa, Tanzania in 1946, Shivji was for 36 years a distinguished professor in constitutional law in the University of Dar es Salaam's Faculty of Law. He is a professor of international renown, having built his reputation through the publication of over 18 books, numerous articles and book chapters. Shivji has served as advocate of the high court and the Court of Appeal of Tanzania since 1977 and advocate of the high court in Zanzibar since 1989. He has received several national and international distinguished scholar awards, including an honorary doctorate from the University of East London, UK and one from Rhodes University, South Africa. Shivji has devoted most of his life to addressing issues on the exploitation of Tanzanians through both the national and the international economic and legal orders. Shivji presently occupies the Mwalimu Julius Nyerere Research Chair in Pan-African Studies of the University of Dar es Salaam. Most recently, he has been working on the political economy of economic reforms in Tanzania. While mostly based in Tanzania, he has been visiting professor in various locations: El Colegio De Mexico, the University of Zimbabwe, the University of Warwick, the National Law School of India University, the University of Hong Kong, the Centre of African Studies of the University of Cape Town, South Africa, the Institute for Poverty, Land and Agrarian Studies at the University of the Western Cape and CODESRIA, Dakar, Senegal.

Shivji earned his LL.M and PhD at the London School of Economics and Political Science (LSE) and the University of Dar es Salaam respectively. He also holds an LL.B from the University of Dar es Salaam in Tanzania. He is married with children.

Honours and awards

Honorary degrees
University of East London, Honoris Causa (LL.D), 1997

Select publications
 Where is Uhuru? Reflections on the Struggle for Democracy in Africa (UFAHAMU Books, Pambazuka Press) (2009)
 Silences in NGO Discourse: The role and future of NGOs in Africa (Fahamu Books, Pambazuka Press) (2007)
 Pan Africanism in Nyerere's Thoughts (Fahamu Books, Pambazuka Press) (2009)
 Pan-Africanism or Pragmatism. Lessons of the Tanganyika-Zanzibar Union (Mkuki na Nyota Publishers) (2008)
 The Concept of Human Rights in Africa (Codesria) (1989)

References

External links
CV:Issa G. Shivji

1946 births
Living people
Tanzanian non-fiction writers
University of Dar es Salaam alumni
Alumni of the London School of Economics
Academic staff of the University of Dar es Salaam
Tanzanian people of Indian descent
People from Morogoro Region
Khoja Ismailism
Gujarati people